"Mi Rowsu" is a song written and performed by Surinamese singer Damaru. The song became a great success in Suriname. Another version of the song, which features Jan Smit, became a huge hit in the Netherlands.

Damaru version 

"Mi Rowsu" (English: My Rose) is a single by Surinamese singer Damaru from his album Mi Rowsu.  He wrote the song for his daughter Dinoura. The song was released in Suriname in 2007. It reached the peak position of the Surinam charts and stayed there for nine weeks. Two years later, the song was released in the Netherlands. It reached the 7th position in the Mega Single Top 100 and the 14th position in the Dutch Top 40.

Charts and certifications

Charts

Release history

Damaru featuring Jan Smit version

Damaru recorded a new version of "Mi Rowsu" with famous Dutch singer Jan Smit, under the name "Mi Rowsu (Tuintje in mijn hart)" (My Rose (Garden In My Heart)). This song became a huge hit in the Netherlands. It reached the peak position in both the Mega Single Top 100 and the Dutch Top 40. The song won the "Sterren.nl Award for Best Song of 2009" and the "100% NL Award for Biggest Hit of 2009". In September 2009, the song reached the platinum status in the Netherlands (20,000 singles sold).

Charts and certifications

Charts

Decade-end charts

Certifications

Awards

See also
List of Dutch Top 40 number-one singles of 2009

References

2007 singles
2009 singles
Dutch Top 40 number-one singles
2007 songs